The Monastery of St. Basil of Ostrog is a Serbian Orthodox monastery located in the center of the city Bijeljina, Republika Srpska, Bosnia and Herzegovina.

References 

Bijeljina
Serbian Orthodox monasteries in Bosnia and Herzegovina
Buildings and structures in Republika Srpska